Mark Orval (born 19 March 1968) is a former Australian rules footballer who played with Collingwood in the Victorian Football League (VFL).

A Hamilton Imperials recruit, Orval appeared for Collingwood in six of the last seven rounds of the 1987 VFL season. He missed one game through suspension, for striking Jim Stynes, then returned against Essendon at the MCG in the final round and kicked four goals. His next appearance came against Geelong in the last round of the 1988 VFL season and Orval suffered a career-ending injury, fracturing his right foot.

He is the father of Dylan Orval, who was picked up by Adelaide in the 2012 Rookie Draft.

Orval currently resides in Melbourne, and has become an unwilling viral internet celebrity under the name '#AngryDad' which to February 2019, has over 1,200,000 Facebook likes and over 200,000 YouTube subscribers. He is the subject of a series of prank videos showing his short temper filmed by his sons Mitchell (26), and Dylan (29).

References

1968 births
Australian rules footballers from Victoria (Australia)
Collingwood Football Club players
Hamilton Imperials Football Club players
Living people